Rubén Almanza (28 July 1929 – 5 January 2020) was a Mexican basketball player. He competed in the men's tournament at the 1952 Summer Olympics.

References

External links
 

1929 births
2020 deaths
Mexican men's basketball players
Olympic basketball players of Mexico
Basketball players at the 1952 Summer Olympics
Basketball players at the 1955 Pan American Games
Basketball players from Chihuahua
Pan American Games competitors for Mexico